The 1991 Australian Drivers' Championship was a CAMS sanctioned national motor racing title for drivers of Formula Brabham racing cars. The winner of the championship was awarded the 1991 CAMS Gold Star.

Touring car driver Mark Skaife won his first Australian Drivers' Championship. All seven rounds of the series were held at the new Eastern Creek Raceway in Sydney.

Calendar
The title was contested over a seven-round series:
 Round 1, Eastern Creek Raceway, New South Wales, 26 May
 Round 2, Eastern Creek Raceway, New South Wales, 21 July
 Round 3, Eastern Creek Raceway, New South Wales, 21 July
 Round 4, Eastern Creek Raceway, New South Wales, 25 August
 Round 5, Eastern Creek Raceway, New South Wales, 25 August
 Round 6, Eastern Creek Raceway, New South Wales, 29 September
 Round 7, Eastern Creek Raceway, New South Wales, 29 September
Championship points were awarded on a 20–15–12–10–8–6–4–3–2–1 basis to the top ten finishers in each round. 
Australian Formula 2 cars were invited to compete in Rounds 4, 5, 6 & 7 however only the ten best placed Formula Brabham drivers were eligible to score points.
The best six performances from the seven rounds were counted towards a driver's points total.

Results

References 

 Australian Motor Racing Year, 1991/92
 CAMS Manual of Motor Sport, 1991
 www.formulaholden.com (retrieved December 2001)
 Official Programme, Foster's Australian Grand Prix, 31 Oct – 3 Nov 1991
 www.camsmanual.com.au

Australian Drivers' Championship
Drivers' Championship
Formula Holden
Motorsport at Eastern Creek Raceway